is a 3D arena fighting video game released in 2001 by both Sega and Capcom for the Sega NAOMI and Dreamcast, based upon the Heavy Metal license.

Using similar perspective and control scheme to Capcom's Spawn: In the Demon's Hand, the game presents up to 4-player combats in large arenas in what is seen as a follow up to the basics of Capcom's Power Stone series, although more oriented to weapon fighting/shooting and a serious and dark cyberpunk tone because of the Heavy Metal universe setting. The game features a soundtrack of licensed music by artists such as Megadeth, Halford, W.A.S.P., Corrosion of Conformity and Dust to Dust. A soundtrack CD featuring songs used in the game as well as songs from other artists was released by Sanctuary Records to tie in with the game.

Reception

The Dreamcast version received "mixed" reviews according to the review aggregation website Metacritic. In Japan, Famitsu gave it a score of 27 out of 40.

Also in Japan, Game Machine listed the arcade version on their November 1, 2001 issue as being the tenth most-successful arcade game of the month.

References

External links
 

Heavy Metal (magazine)
2001 video games
Capcom games
Arcade video games
Dreamcast games
Fighting games
Video games based on comics
Video games developed in Japan
Video games scored by Tetsuya Shibata
Cyberpunk video games